Gamma is General Motors' global subcompact front-wheel drive automobile platform, first used in the 2000 Opel Corsa C.

Gamma / GM4300
The first version of the platform was issued in autumn 2000 with the introduction of Opel Corsa C and was a development of the earlier GM4200 platform used in previous Corsa models, developed by Opel in Germany.

Vehicles based on this platform:
 2000–2006 Opel Corsa C
 2001–2010 Opel Combo C
 2002–2010 Opel Meriva A
 2003–2011 Chevrolet Montana
 2004–2009 Opel Tigra TwinTop B

Gamma II

GM Korea has taken responsibility for future development of GM's GSV (Global Small Vehicle) architecture. This architecture will eventually be used for all small vehicles from GM, as a true global small car platform.
While the original Gamma was developed by Opel, the Gamma II platform is under the leadership of GM Korea (formerly GM Daewoo).

The vehicles will be assembled at factories in the United States, Indonesia, Ecuador, Brazil, Germany, Colombia, Spain, India, South Korea, Mexico, Thailand, Venezuela, Uzbekistan, Vietnam, China and Russia.

Current and announced vehicles based on Gamma II (GSV) platform:
 2010- Chevrolet Spark, Holden Barina Spark
 2010-2014 Chevrolet Sail
 2011-2020 Chevrolet Aveo/Sonic, Holden Barina
 2011-2019 Chevrolet Cobalt
 2012- Chevrolet Spin
 2013-2019 Opel/Vauxhall Mokka 
 2013-2022 Buick Encore 
 2013- Chevrolet Onix, Chevrolet Joy
 2013- Chevrolet Prisma Mk II, Chevrolet Joy Plus
 2013-2022 Chevrolet Trax
2014-2019 Opel Karl/Vauxhall Viva
2015-2022 Chevrolet Spark, Holden Spark 
2019-2022 VinFast Fadil

Gamma II concept vehicles:
 2010 Chevrolet Aveo RS concept car
 2010 Cadillac Urban Luxury Concept
 2010 GMC Granite

References

Gamma